Worser may refer to:

Worser Bay, a bay in New Zealand
Worser Creek, a stream in Texas, USA

See also

 Worse (disambiguation)
 Worst (disambiguation)
 Worster, surname